Hustler TV is an American semi-hardcore pornographic premium television channel available through satellite, video on demand and digital cable.  The channel is dedicated to offering explicit adult material, uncut and uncensored from Hustler. The channel is owned by LFP Broadcasting.

See also
 Hustler TV Canada
 Hustler TV (Europe)
 Blue Hustler

References

External links
 

American pornographic television channels
Nudity in television
Television pornography